Abutilon indicum (Indian abutilon, Indian mallow) is a small shrub in the family Malvaceae, native to tropical and subtropical regions. This plant is a valuable medicinal and ornamental plant, its roots and leaves being used for curing fevers. It has been widely introduced outside of its native range, and is considered invasive on certain tropical islands.
Hindi name: कंंघाइ "Kanghai"
Urdu name: کنگھی "Kanghi" 
Tamil name: துத்தி "thuthi"
Sanskrit name: अतिबला Atibalaa
Tulu name: "urki"
Telugu name: Duvvena Kayalu "duvvena benda"(దువ్వెన బెండ)
Kannada name: TuThThi gida (ತುಥ್ಥಿ ಗಿಡ)
Malayalam name:വെള്ളൂരം
Odia name: ପେଡ଼ି ପେଡ଼ିକା "Pedi Pedika"

Distribution
The species occurs in a number of tropical and subtropical zones. An example occurrence is within parts of the Great Barrier Reef islands of the Coral Sea.

Traditional medicine

In traditional medicine, A. indicum various parts of the plant are used as a demulcent, aphrodisiac, laxative, diuretic, sedative, astringent, expectorant, tonic, anti-convulsant, anti-inflammatory, anthelmintic, and analgesic and to treat leprosy, ulcers, headaches, gonorrhea, and bladder infection. The whole plant is uprooted, dried and is powdered. In ancient days, maidens were made to consume a spoonful of this powder with a spoonful of honey, once in a day, for 6 months until the day of marriage, for a safe and quick pregnancy.

The plant is commonly used in Siddha medicines. The root, bark, flowers, leaves and seeds are all used for medicinal purposes by Tamils. The leaves are used as adjunct to medicines used for pile complaints. The flowers are used to increase semen in men.

Chemistry
β-Sitosterol is present in A. indicum and a petroleum ether extract has larvicidal properties against the mosquito larvae Culex quinquefasciatus.  A methanol extract of A. indicum has some antimicrobial properties.

References

External links

Abutilon indicum, Indian Mallow Sinhalese Name:Beheth Anoda Indian Mallow, Abutilon
Abutilon indicum photo
Abutilon indicum (Linn.) Sweet Medicinal Plant Images Database (School of Chinese Medicine, Hong Kong Baptist University)  

indicum
Flora of Palestine (region)
Flora of Pakistan
Flora of Syria
Flora of Maharashtra
Plants described in 1756